James E. Coates is a Baptist minister and former Democratic politician in Washington, D.C.

Early years
James E. Coates was born to Louise and George E. Coates. He attended Howard University's School of Religion, and he graduated with honors.

Religious career
Rev. Coates has been the pastor of Bethlehem Baptist Church since October 5, 1957.

Political career

District of Columbia Board of Education

Nomination in 1967
In 1967, Coates was nominated for one of three open seats on the District of Columbia Board of Education. Coates had served as staff director of the Congress Heights Neighborhood Development Center. Coates supported opening schools year-round. He also supported privatizing the operation of vocational schools. Coates' candidacy was endorsed by Americans for Democratic Action and D.C. Citizens for Better Public Education. At the time, federal district judges appointed the members of the District of Columbia Board of Elections. The federal judges decided to appoint other individuals to the District of Columbia Board of Education.

Candidacy in 1968
The first public election for members of the District of Columbia Board of Education was held in 1968. Coates was a candidate to represent Ward 8 on the District of Columbia Board of Education. Coates' nomination was endorsed by the Washington Baptist Ministers Conference. Coates supported more training for teachers and contracting with a private developer to build new schools. Coates' candidacy was endorsed by the Washington Teachers Union, the District Republicans, the Baptist Ministers Conference of Washington, D.C., the D.C. Education Association, and the editorial board of The Washington Post. Coates and Edward E. Saunders both advanced to a run-off election. The D.C. Democrats declined to endorse him. Coates won the run-off election, receiving 1,584 votes to Saunders' 1,187 votes.

First term
Coates' term in office began on January 26, 1969. The members of the District of Columbia Board of Education elected Coates president.

In February 1969, Coates joined other members of the Board of Education to review school textbooks for examples of racism and outdated content. A high-school textbook described Southerners during the Civil War as "ready to defend the Southern way of life...slavery or no slavery". Another textbook described Ho Chih Minh as the leader of an "independent movement".

Council of the District of Columbia
Coates was elected as one of the original members of the Council of the District of Columbia in 1974 when D.C. gained home rule. Coates represented Ward 8 on the council from 1975 to 1977.

Personal life
Coates married Marcia Hall Otey in January 1987.

References

20th-century American politicians
African-American Baptist ministers
Baptist ministers from the United States
Members of the Council of the District of Columbia
Living people
Washington, D.C., Democrats
Year of birth missing (living people)
20th-century African-American politicians
African-American men in politics
21st-century African-American people